The following is a list of primary antagonists in the James Bond novels and film series.

Novel villains by author

Ian Fleming

Kingsley Amis (writing as Robert Markham)

Christopher Wood

John Gardner

Raymond Benson

Sebastian Faulks

Jeffery Deaver

William Boyd

Anthony Horowitz

Young Bond series

Charlie Higson

Steve Cole

Villains by comics

Comic strips

Daily Express (1958-1977)
Comic strip serials released by the Daily Express between 1958-1977 were divided in two distinct eras, the John McLusky era from 1958 to 1966, and  Yaroslav Horak & Jim Lawrence era from 1968 to 1977. The Daily Express Bond strips drawn between 1958 to the 1967 "Spy Who Loved Me" storyline are all streamlined adaptations of the Ian Fleming novels and short stories, and feature mainly the same villains. Starting from 1968 with the storyline "The Harpies", all storylines of Jim Lawrence era, with the exception for the adaptation of Kingsley Amis's Colonel Sun, were all original. The Daily Express discontinued publishing James Bond comic strips in 1977. The original creative - Horak, Lawrence and McLusky - would subsequently develop Bond comic strips for other British and European syndications from 1977 to 1984.

Other comic strips (1977-1984)

Dynamite Entertainment

Story Arcs

One-shots

Film villains by production

Eon Productions films

Non-Eon works

Video game villains

Following is a list of original main villains in James Bond computer and video games.

Villainous organisations
 SMERSH – SMiERt SHpionam, "Death to Spies", Bond's original nemesis in the novels, though only taking an active role in the 1954 TV film, 1967 film Casino Royale and only briefly mentioned in the others (apparently disbanded 20 years before the events of The Living Daylights). The Soviet agency is in charge of assassination, loosely based on the real-life SMERSH.
 SPECTRE – SPecial Executive for Counter-intelligence, Terrorism, Revenge and Extortion, first appeared in the novel Thunderball and replaced SMERSH as Bond's nemesis in the films.  The independent terrorist organisation is headed by Ernst Stavro Blofeld. In the 2015 film, Spectre, 007 digs deep into the organisation and tries to get payback for the murder of M (Judi Dench); he discovers the organisation is headed by his adopted brother Franz Oberhauser, now calling himself Blofeld, and that its entire purpose was to personally persecute Bond himself.
 The Spangled Mob – Bond's enemy in the novel Diamonds Are Forever, appearing also in Goldfinger and The Man with the Golden Gun.  The mob is an American Mafia family based in Las Vegas.
 Drax Metals – Hugo Drax's metal company in Moonraker, renamed "Drax Industries" in the film, where it specialises in Space Shuttle-like spacecraft.
 Sternberg Shipping Line – Karl Stromberg's organisation in The Spy Who Loved Me. As well as operating the titular shipping line, it features its own line of laboratories.
 Zorin Enterprises – Max Zorin's multinational conglomerate, operating in computer hardware and mining, in A View to a Kill.
 Entreprises Auric A.G. – Auric Goldfinger's organisation in Goldfinger. Divisions include a stud farm in Kentucky named "Auric Stud".
 KGB – Soviet intelligence agency.
 Janus Syndicate – Alec Trevelyan's vehemently anti-British terrorist organisation in GoldenEye.
 CMGN – Carver Media Group Network, Elliot Carver's self-made mass media empire in Tomorrow Never Dies.
 The Scales of Justice – A movement in John Gardner's The Man from Barbarossa.
 Yakuza – Japanese crime gang in the novel The Man with the Red Tattoo.
 COLD – The Children of Last Days, a terrorist organisation that Bond faces in the novel COLD.
 The Union – A villainous organisation in Raymond Benson's novels High Time to Kill, Doubleshot, and Never Dream of Dying.
 OCTOPUS – Replaces SPECTRE in the video game From Russia with Love (an adaptation of the 1963 film) for copyright reasons.
 BAST – The Brotherhood of Anarchy and Secret Terrorism, featured in the novel Win, Lose or Die.
 Quantum – A shadowy criminal organisation seen in Casino Royale and Quantum of Solace. The organisation is strictly apolitical—but with considerable political influence of their own—and will deal with anyone whose interests converge with their own.  Known members of the organisation include an extensive network of current and former politicians, business people and intelligence agents.  One of their leading members, Dominic Greene, leads a cover organisation called Greene Planet. In Spectre (2015), the organisation is revealed as a division within Spectre, rather than an independent group.
 SCUM – Stands for "Saboteurs and Criminals United in Mayhem", the main villainous organisation in the James Bond Jr. series.
 TAROT – Technological Accession, Revenge and Organized Terror, the replacement for SPECTRE in the James Bond Roleplaying Game produced by Victory Games from 1983 to 1987.
 Phoenix International – Rafael Drake's organisation in Nightfire. Ostensibly a nuclear disposal company, Drake used it to weaponise the nuclear materials it got its hands on in his plan to rule the world.
 King Industries – Sir Robert King's multinational oil and construction company in The World Is Not Enough and its novelisation and video game adaptations. It was formed through the merge of his own construction business and his wife's oil business.
 Osato Chemicals and Engineering – Mr. Osato's company, supplying chemicals and engineering equipment in You Only Live Twice, heavily affiliated with SPECTRE.
 Graves Corporation – Gustav Graves' diamond-mining business in Die Another Day.
 Greene Planet – Dominic Greene's environmentalist organisation in Quantum of Solace. Really a front for the operations of Quantum, and by extension, Spectre.
 Sanchez Cartel – drug cartel run by Franz Sanchez in Licence to Kill, operating in both Americas and hiding behind many front organisations.
 Rahani Electronics – major electronics company mentioned in Role of Honour and Nobody Lives for Ever, owned by SPECTRE commander Tamil Rahani, and possibly used by SPECTRE as a front.

See also
 Outline of James Bond

References

Bond
Villains
Bond villains